Aschoff is a German surname. Notable people with the surname include:

Edward Aschoff (1985–2019), American sports journalist
Eva Aschoff (1900–1969), German artist
Jürgen Aschoff (1913–1998), German physician, biologist and behavioral psychologist
Ludwig Aschoff (1866–1942), German physician and pathologist

See also
Hermann Höpker-Aschoff (1883–1954), German politician

German-language surnames